Victory Through Air Power is a 1943 American Technicolor animated documentary propaganda film produced by Walt Disney Productions and released by United Artists on July 17, 1943. It is based on the 1942 book Victory Through Air Power by Alexander P. de Seversky. De Seversky appeared in the film, an unusual departure from the Disney animated feature films of the time. 

Edward H. Plumb, Paul J. Smith and Oliver Wallace were nominated for the Academy Award for Best Music Score of a Dramatic or Comedy Picture.

Production
Walt Disney read Victory through Air Power and felt that its message was so important that he personally financed the animated production of the book. The film was primarily created to express Seversky's theories to government officials and the public. Movie critic Richard Schickel says that Disney "pushed the film out in a hurry, even setting aside his distrust of limited animation under the impulses of urgency" (the only obvious use of limited animation, however, is in diagrammatic illustrations of Seversky's talking points. These illustrations featured continuous flowing streams of iconic aircraft, forming bridges or shields, and munitions flowing along assembly lines). It was not until 1945 Disney was able to pay off his $1.2 million ($17m 2021) war film deficit. After Disney's main distributor at the time RKO Radio Pictures refused to release the film in theaters, Walt decided to have United Artists (the distributor of many of his shorts between 1932 and 1937) release it instead, making it the first and only Disney animated feature to be released by a different movie studio other than RKO or Walt Disney Studios.

Reception
On July 11, 1943, the New York Times devoted a half page, "Victory from the Air," to a feature consisting of pictures of scenes from the film with short captions. This was possibly the first time that such skilled use of visual description had been placed at the service of an abstract political argument.

Schickel quotes film critic James Agee as hoping that:

Impact

On December 8, 1941, Disney studios were essentially converted into a propaganda machine for the United States government. While most World War II films were created for training purposes, films such as Victory Through Air Power were created to catch the attention of government officials and to build public morale among the U.S. and Allied powers. Among the notables who decided after seeing the film that Seversky and Disney knew what they were talking about were Winston Churchill and Franklin D. Roosevelt.

The Disney studio sent a print for them to view when they were attending the Quebec Conference. According to Leonard Maltin, "it changed FDR's way of thinking—he agreed that Seversky was right." Maltin also adds that "it was only after Roosevelt saw 'Victory Through Air Power' that our country made the commitment to long-range bombing", although that is incorrect as the Allied Combined Bomber Offensive had already begun on June 10, 1943, two months before Roosevelt saw the movie. Roosevelt recognized that film was an effective way to teach and Disney could provide Washington with high quality information. The American people were becoming united and Disney was able to inform them of the situation without presenting excessive chaos, as cartoons often do.  The animation was popular among soldiers and was superior to other documentary films and written instructions at the time.

The film played a significant role for the Disney Corporation because it was the true beginning of educational films. The educational films would be, and still are, continually produced and used for the military, schools, and factory instruction. The company learned how to effectively communicate their ideas and efficiently produce the films while introducing the Disney characters to millions of people worldwide. Throughout the rest of the war, Disney characters effectively acted as ambassadors to the world. In addition to Victory Through Air Power, Disney produced Donald Gets Drafted, Education for Death, Der Fuehrer's Face, and various training films for the military, reusing animation from Victory Through Air Power in some of them.

One scene showed a fictional rocket bomb destroying a fortified German submarine pen. According to anecdote, this directly inspired the British to develop a real rocket bomb to attack targets that were heavily protected with thick concrete. Due to its origin, the weapon became known as the Disney bomb, and saw limited use before the war ended. In retrospect, some of Seversky's proposals were derided as impractical, such as operating a major long-range air bombardment campaign from the Aleutians, a series of islands reaching westward from Alaska, which is a remote area with a highly volatile climate that makes for dangerous flying conditions.

Home media
After its release and re-release in 1943 and 1944, there was no theatrical release for 60 years, perhaps because it was seen as propaganda, or perhaps because it was deemed offensive to Germans and Japanese. (It was, however, available in 16 mm prints and occasionally screened in film history retrospectives. Additionally, the introductory "history-of-aviation" scene was excerpted in various episodes of the Disney anthology series on TV). In 2004, the film was released on DVD as part of the Walt Disney Treasures collection Walt Disney on the Front Lines.  After the war, Disney's characters, especially Mickey Mouse and Donald Duck, were enthusiastically received in Japan and Germany, where they remain immensely popular today.

See also
Walt Disney's World War II propaganda production
Bombing of Tokyo, and the devastating Operation Meetinghouse raid (9/10 March 1945)
Red Tails

References

Notes

Citations

Bibliography

 Artz, Lee. "The Righteousness of Self-Centered Royals: the World According to Disney Animation." Critical Arts 18 (2004): 116–31. Literature Resource Center, October 30, 2006.
 Combs, James. Film Propaganda and American Politics: Analysis and Filmography. New York: Garland Publishing, 1994. .
 Delehanty, Thorton. "The Disney Studio At War." Theatre Arts: the International Magazine of Theatre and Screen, January 1943, pp. 31–39.
 Gabler, Neal. Walt Disney: The Triumph of the American Imagination. New York: Vantage Books, 2006. .
 Gooch, John, ed. Airpower: Theory and Practice (Strategic Studies Series). London: Frank Cass and Co. Ltd., 1995. .
 Grant, Joe. "A Conversation with Joe Grant" in Victory Through Air Power in Walt Disney Treasures: On the Front Lines, [Collector's Tin], Dir. Walt Disney, 1941–44, DVD, Disney, 2004.
 Hagen, Sheila. "Wartime Animation Exhibit: Panel Discussion on 'Victory Through Air Power'." Mouse Planet, November 6, 2003. Retrieved: 19 August 2010.
 Hench, John. "A Conversation with John Hench" in Victory Through Air Power in Walt Disney Treasures: On the Front Lines, [Collector's Tin], Dir. Walt Disney, 1941–44, DVD, Disney, 2004.
 Lesjak, David. "When Disney Went to War." World War II 20, 2005, pp. 22–56. Academic Search Premier. EBSCO. Augustana Tredway Library, October 30, 2006.
 Ross, Sherwood. "How the United States Reversed Its Policy on Bombing Civilians." The Humanist 65, 2005. Retrieved: November 2, 2006.
 Schickel, Richard. The Disney Version. New York: Simon and Schuster, 1968.
 Spillman, Pat.  92nd Bomb Group (H): Fame's Favored Few. New York: Turner Publishing Company, 1997.  .
 Tillman, Barrett. Whirlwind: The Air War Against Japan 1942-1945. New York: Simon & Schuster, 2010. .
 Victory Through Air Power in Walt Disney Treasures: On the Front Lines, [Collector's Tin]. Disney Studios: Dir. Walt Disney, 1941–44, DVD, 2004.

External links

 
 Victory Through Air Power at Don Markstein's Toonopedia
 
 
 

1943 films
1943 documentary films
1940s English-language films
American animated documentary films
American films with live action and animation
American aviation films
American World War II propaganda films
Disney animated films
Documentary films about military aviation
Films based on non-fiction books
Films directed by James Algar
Films directed by Clyde Geronimi
Films directed by Jack Kinney
Films produced by Walt Disney
Films set in the 1900s
Films set in the 1910s
Films set in the 1920s
Films set in the 1930s
Films set in the 1940s
United Artists films
United Artists animated films
1943 animated films
Walt Disney Pictures films
1940s American animated films
Films scored by Paul Smith (film and television composer)
Films scored by Oliver Wallace